Lanu-puisto is a park near Pikku-Vesijärvi in Lahti, Finland. There are 12 statues of concrete made by the sculptor Olavi Lanu. The park was built in 1988–1992.

References
Statues
Olavi Lanu in Lahti library's pages

Kartano
Sculpture gardens, trails and parks in Europe
Tourist attractions in Päijät-Häme